In complex analysis, a branch of mathematics, Bloch's theorem describes the behaviour of holomorphic functions defined on the unit disk. It gives a lower bound on the size of a disk in which an inverse to a holomorphic function exists. It is named after André Bloch.

Statement
Let f be a holomorphic function in the unit disk |z| ≤ 1 for which

Bloch's Theorem states that there is a disk S ⊂ D on which f is biholomorphic and f(S) contains a disk with radius 1/72.

Landau's theorem
If f is a holomorphic function in the unit disk with the property |f′(0)| = 1, then let Lf be the radius of the largest disk contained in the image of f.

Landau's theorem states that there is a constant L defined as the infimum of Lf over all such functions f, and that L ≥ B.

This theorem is named after Edmund Landau.

Valiron's theorem
Bloch's theorem was inspired by the following theorem of Georges Valiron:

Theorem. If f is a non-constant entire function then there exist disks D of arbitrarily large radius and analytic functions φ in D such that f(φ(z)) = z for z in D.

Bloch's theorem corresponds to Valiron's theorem via the so-called Bloch's Principle.

Proof

Landau's theorem
We first prove the case when f(0) = 0, f′(0) = 1, 

and |f′(z)| ≤ 2 in the unit disk.

By Cauchy's integral formula, we have a bound

where γ is the counterclockwise circle of radius r around z,

and 0 < r < 1 − |z|. 

By Taylor's theorem, for each z in the unit disk, there exists 0 ≤ t ≤ 1 

such that f(z) = z + z2f″(tz) / 2. 

Thus, if |z| = 1/3 and |w| < 1/6, we have

By Rouché's theorem, the range of f contains the disk of radius 1/6 around 0.

Let D(z0, r) denote the open disk of radius r around z0. 

For an analytic function g : D(z0, r) → C such that g(z0) ≠ 0,

the case above applied to (g(z0 + rz) − g(z0)) / (rg′(0)) 

implies that the range of g contains D(g(z0), |g′(0)|r / 6).

For the general case, let f be an analytic function in the unit 

disk such that |f′(0)| = 1, and z0 = 0.
 If |f′(z)| ≤ 2|f′(z0)| for |z − z0| < 1/4, then by the first case, 
 the range of f contains a disk of radius |f′(z0)| / 24 = 1/24. 
 Otherwise, there exists z1 such that |z1 − z0| < 1/4 and |f′(z1)| > 2|f′(z0)|.
 If |f′(z)| ≤ 2|f′(z1)| for |z − z1| < 1/8, then by the first case, 
 the range of f contains a disk of radius |f′(z1)| / 48 > |f′(z0)| / 24 = 1/24. 
 Otherwise, there exists z2 such that |z2 − z1| < 1/8 and |f′(z2)| > 2|f′(z1)|.
Repeating this argument, we either find a disk of radius at least 1/24

in the range of f, proving the theorem, or find an infinite sequence (zn) 

such that |zn − zn−1| < 1/2n+1 and |f′(zn)| > 2|f′(zn−1)|. 

In the latter case the sequence is in D(0, 1/2), 

so f′ is unbounded in D(0, 1/2), a contradiction.

Bloch's Theorem
In the proof of Landau's Theorem above, Rouché's theorem

implies that not only can we find a disk D of radius at least 1/24

in the range of f, but there is also a small disk D0 inside the 

unit disk such that for every w ∈ D there is a unique z ∈ D0 

with f(z) = w. Thus, f is a bijective analytic function from 

D0 ∩ f−1(D) to D, so its inverse φ is also analytic by the

inverse function theorem.

Bloch's and Landau's constants 
The number B is called the Bloch's constant.  The lower bound 1/72 

in Bloch's theorem is not the best possible. Bloch's theorem tells us 

B ≥ 1/72, but the exact value of B is still unknown.

The best known bounds for B at present are

where Γ is the Gamma function.  The lower bound was proved by Chen and Gauthier, and the upper bound dates back to Ahlfors and Grunsky.

The similarly defined optimal constant L in Landau's theorem is called the Landau's constant. Its exact value is also unknown, but it is known that
 

In their paper, Ahlfors and Grunsky conjectured that their upper bounds are actually the true values of B and L.

For injective holomorphic functions on the unit disk, a constant A can similarly be defined. It is known that

See also 
 Table of selected mathematical constants

References

External links 
 
 

Unsolved problems in mathematics
Theorems in complex analysis